From the Notebooks of a Middle School Princess is a 2015 children's novel written and illustrated by Meg Cabot and a spinoff of the author's young adult fiction series, The Princess Diaries. The book, released on May 19, 2015 through Feiwel & Friends, is the first in the series of the same name From the Notebooks of a Middle School Princess. It follows Olivia, a biracial 12-year-old who finds out she is the paternal younger half-sister of Princess Mia Thermopolis.

The story of Olivia's adventures is written diary-style with the author's illustrations mixed in. Of the novel, Cabot has stated that the character of Olivia differs from Mia in that she's "much less neurotic, much more stable" and that her upbringing made the character have a greater appreciation for discovering that she's a princess with previously unknown family members, as she "hasn’t been loved to the degree that Mia has. I mean, Olivia actually likes her grandmother, really appreciates her, and she’s very excited to have this happen to her."

Synopsis
Olivia, full name "Olivia Grace Clarisse Mignonette Harrison", has always been completely average at everything other than art. Other than being a half orphan, her life has been fairly uneventful. 

This all changes when Princess Amelia "Mia" arrives and invites her to come and meet the father that she's never met, Prince Phillipe Renaldo, which makes Princess Mia her elder half-sister. Now Olivia is being whisked off to live with her father and half-sister in a world where she is now a princess in training. How will this change her and will it require leaving everything and more specifically everyone she has ever known behind?

Reception
Critical reception has been positive. The School Library Journal and the Horn Book Guide both reviewed From the Notebooks of a Middle School Princess, with the School Library Journal writing that the "bubble-gum flavored contemporary tale will be a perfect fit for Fancy Nancy alumni and readers not quite ready for Cabot's longer novels". Booklist and Kirkus Reviews also gave favorable reviews, and Booklist felt that "this entertaining, quickly absorbing read will have readers anticipating the sequel."

The Bulletin of the Center for Children's Books was more critical, as they commented that "fans of the earlier series may find this too familiar of a retread" but also stated that "Olivia has an amusing and self-deprecating wit that makes the narration breezy and accessible, and Cabot’s black and white illustrations liven up the tale."

References

External links
 

2015 American novels
Novels by Meg Cabot
American children's novels
2015 children's books
Feiwel & Friends books